Monte Rinaldo is a comune (municipality) in the Province of Fermo in the Italian region Marche, located about  south of Ancona, about  north of Ascoli Piceno and  west of Fermo.

Monte Rinaldo borders the following municipalities: Monsampietro Morico, Montalto delle Marche, Montelparo, Montottone, Ortezzano.

References

Cities and towns in the Marche